Olpad is a town northwest of Surat, India, located at 21.33° north, 72.75° east and about 12 meters above sea level. Olpad is a small town in Surat, having about 50,898 residents.

Olpad is divided by Sena River/Creek into Olpad Kasba/Main and Para/Pura/Suburb.

Olpad has second highest Tiger Shrimp Export area. Lot of oil and gas drilling with 30 kilometers of coastal area. It is Surat's nearest fast developing town, sharing a parliamentary seat with Surat West.

It has 3 colleges, industrial technical institute, courts, police station, banks and government offices.

Olpad is a junction connecting by many roads to and from Surat, Sayan, Kim, Ankleshwar, Dandi, and Bhatgam.
It is a cheap alternative for business or industries. Railway station (Sayan) is 9 miles away. A future Metro is also
planned from Sachin to Sayan, makes perfect suburb living with much cleaner and cooler air than Surat due to farming and shrimp ponds between town and ocean. All the roads from Olpad to neighbouring city and towns are very good.

It is very economical to live in Olpad than Surat. You can save 40% of your income living in Olpad. Olpad has everything, I mean everything from Suzuki Car Dealership and Many Motorcycles dealership. Fresh Milk, Fresh Vegetables, good Veg and Non Veg restaurants. Also Lots of Pharmacies. You can find everything except McDonald and KFC. 

Olpad population consists of Hindus, Muslims, people from UP, Maharashtra, Rajasthan among others. They all live in peace and harmony.

See also 
List of tourist attractions in Surat

Suburban area of Surat
Cities and towns in Surat district